Breaking Point or The Breaking Point may refer to:

Film
 The Breaking Point (1921 film), an American film by  Paul Scardon
 The Breaking Point (1924 film), an American film by Herbert Brenon
 The Breaking Point (1950 film), an American adaptation of Ernest Hemingway's To Have and Have Not
 The Breaking Point (1961 film), a British crime film by Lance Comfort
 Breaking Point (1975 film), a Swedish erotic horror film by Bo Arne Vibenius
 Breaking Point (1976 film), an American film by Bob Clark
 Breaking Point (1989 film), an American television remake of the 1965 suspense film 36 Hours
 Breaking Point (1993 film), a film starring Gary Busey
 Breaking Point (2005 film), a Canadian TV documentary about the 1995 Quebec sovereignty referendum
 Breaking Point (2009 film), an American action film starring Tom Berenger

Literature
 The Breaking Point (play), a 1923 play by Mary Roberts Rinehart
 The Breaking Point (short story collection), a 1959 short story collection by Daphne du Maurier
 Breaking Point (novel), a 2002 young adult novel by Alex Flinn
 The Breaking Point, a 1922 mystery novel by Mary Roberts Rinehart

Music
 Breaking Point (band), an American hard rock/alternative rock band

Albums
 Breaking Point (Central Line album) (1982)
 Breaking Point (Digital Summer album) (2012)
 Breaking Point!, a 1964 album by Freddie Hubbard or its title composition
 Breaking Point (Lunatic Calm album) (2002)
 Breakin' Point, a 2016 album by Peter Bjorn and John

Songs
 "Breaking Point" (Bullet for My Valentine song) (2013)
 "Breaking Point" (Keri Hilson song) (2010)
 "Breakin' Point" (song), a 2016 song by Peter Bjorn and John
 "Breaking Point", a 1989 song by The Alarm
 "Breaking Point", a song by Amaranthe from Amaranthe
 "The Breaking Point", a song by Bacharach & David, covered by Normie Rowe
 "Breaking Point", a 1984 song by Bourgie Bourgie
 "Breaking Point", a 2013 song by Crown the Empire
 "Breaking Point", a song by Dead by April from Worlds Collide
 "Breaking Point", a 1988 song by the Moody Blues from Sur la Mer
 "Breaking Point", a song by Parkway Drive from Horizons

Television

Series 
 Breaking Point (1963 TV series), an American medical drama
 The Breaking Point (1991 TV series), a Hong Kong series
 Breaking Point (2010 TV series), a Discovery Channel Canada reality/documentary series
 Breaking Pointe, a 2012 American reality series

Episodes 
 "Breaking Point" (Alias)
 "The Breaking Point" (Band of Brothers)
 "Breaking Point" (The Outer Limits)
 UFC 81: Breaking Point, a 2008 pay-per-view event
 WWE Breaking Point, a 2009 pay-per-view event

Other uses
 Breaking point (psychology), a critical moment of personal stress

See also 
 Break point, in tennis scoring
 Breakpoint (disambiguation)
 Nervous breakdown (disambiguation)
 Point Break, a 1991 action film
 Psychotic break